The Sanremo Music Festival 1956 was the sixth annual Sanremo Music Festival, held at the Sanremo Casino in Sanremo, province of Imperia between 8 and 10 March 1956. The show was presented by actor Fausto Tommei, assisted by television announcer Maria Teresa Ruta.

According to the rules of this edition every song was performed by a newcomer artist in the music scene, selected through the "Voci Nuove" competition among 6.446 participants, with some artists performing multiple songs.

The winner of the Festival was "Aprite le finestre", performed by Franca Raimondi.

The festival also inspired the international Eurovision Song Contest, which held its inaugural edition this year, and the two first placed songs of this edition represented Italy at Eurovision.

Participants and results 

This Sanremo Music Festival edition included twenty songs performed by six singers, spread over three consecutive evenings, in a format of two semi-finals and a final. The first two semi-final nights were held on 8 and 9 March, and the final on 10 March 1956. Ten songs competed in each semi-final. Five songs from each night advanced to compose again ten songs for the third and final night. The ranking and the points of the final are known while those of the semi finals are not published.

Eurovision Song Contest
The two first places of this Sanremo Music Festival edition, "Aprite le finestre" sung by Franca Raimondi, and "Amami se vuoi" sung by Tonina Torrielli, went on to perform at the international Eurovision Song Contest.

There were seven participating countries, and each was drawn to perform two songs in the same order via two rounds, with Italy performing last in each round, following Luxembourg. "Aprite le finestre" was performed seventh, and "Amami se vuoi" fourteenth as the last song of the evening. Only one of Switzerland's songs was declared, as the winner, after the private counting of the votes by the juries, and so the scores and placings of the two Italian songs are unknown. The two songs were succeeded as Italian representative at the 1957 contest by Nunzio Gallo with "Corde della mia chitarra".

References

External links 
  from Diggiloo Thrush - info & lyrics for "Aprite le finestre"
  from Diggiloo Thrush - info & lyrics for "Amami se vuoi"

Sanremo Music Festival by year
1956 in Italian music
1956 in Italian television
1956 music festivals